SS Jean Ribaut was a Liberty ship built in the United States during World War II. She was named after Jean Ribaut, a French naval officer, navigator, and colonizer.

Construction
Jean Ribaut was laid down on 23 March 1944, under a Maritime Commission (MARCOM) contract, MC hull 2300, by J.A. Jones Construction, Panama City, Florida; she was sponsored by Miss Betty Jean Riley, an honor student at Bay County High School, and launched on 5 May 1944.

History
She was allocated to A.H. Bull & Co., Inc., on 29 May 1944. On 17 November 1947, she was laid up in the National Defense Reserve Fleet, in the James River Group. On 22 April 1952, she was relocated to the National Defense Reserve Fleet, in the Hudson River Group. On 18 August 1953, she was withdrawn from the fleet to be loaded with grain under the "Grain Program 1953". She returned loaded with grain to the fleet on 28 August 1953. On 10 May 1956, she was withdrawn from the fleet to have the grain unloaded. She returned to the fleet with a new load of grain on 1 June 1956. She was withdrawn from the fleet on 3 July 1957, to unload and returned empty on 8 July 1957. On 6 June 1958, she was withdrawn to be loaded with grain and returned on 20 June 1958. On 25 January 1960, she was removed for the last time to be unloaded, she returned empty on 3 February 1960. On 13 March 1970, she was sold for $41,212 to Union Minerals and Alloys Corporation, for scrapping. She was withdrawn from the fleet on 21 April 1970.

References

Bibliography

 
 
 
 
 

 

Liberty ships
Ships built in Panama City, Florida
1944 ships
James River Reserve Fleet
Hudson River Reserve Fleet
Hudson River Reserve Fleet Grain Program